Princess Augusta of Waldeck-Pyrmont (21 July 1824 – 4 September 1893) was a German noblewoman.  She was the eldest daughter of George II, Prince of Waldeck and Pyrmont and his wife, Princess Emma of Anhalt-Bernburg-Schaumburg-Hoym.  She was an aunt of the Dutch queen regent Emma of Waldeck and Pyrmont.

She married on 15 June 1848 to Count Alfred of Stolberg-Stolberg.  They had seven children:
 Wolffgang, 2nd Prince of Stolberg-Stolberg (1849–1903)
 Everhard (1851–1851)
 Walrad (1854–1906)
 Henry (1855–1935)
 Erica (1856–1926)
 Albert (1861–1903)
 Volkwin (1865–1935)

Ancestry

House of Waldeck
Princesses of Waldeck and Pyrmont
House of Stolberg
1824 births
1893 deaths
19th-century German people
Daughters of monarchs